Presidential elections were held for the first time in the Republic of Upper Volta on 3 October 1965, as previously the President had been appointed by the National Assembly. At the time, the country was a one-party state, with the Voltaic Democratic Union–African Democratic Rally (UDV–RDA) as the sole legal party. Its leader, Maurice Yaméogo, was the only candidate, and was re-elected with 100% of the vote. Voter turnout was 98.4%.

Results

References

Presidential elections in Burkina Faso
Upper Volta
Presidential election
One-party elections
Single-candidate elections